Selvakumara Chinnayan S  (b 1960) is an Indian politician and Member of Parliament elected from Tamil Nadu. He is elected to the Lok Sabha from Erode constituency as an Anna Dravida Munnetra Kazhagam candidate in 2014 election.

He is the lawyers' wing secretary of the party's Erode urban unit and was a public prosecutor during 2001–2006.

References 

All India Anna Dravida Munnetra Kazhagam politicians
Living people
India MPs 2014–2019
Lok Sabha members from Tamil Nadu
1960 births
People from Erode district